Why Don't You Just Die is a 2018 Russian dark comedy thriller film directed by Kirill Sokolov and starring Aleksandr Kuznetsov, Vitaly Khaev, Yevgenia Kregzhde and Yelena Shevchenko. The release took place in Russia on April 4, 2019.

Cast
 Aleksandr Kuznetsov as Matvey
  as Andrey Gennadievitch
  as Olga "Olya" Lekhovskaya
 Yelena Shevchenko as Natalia "Tasha", Olya's mother
 Mikhail Gorevoy as Yevgenich
 Igor Grabuzov as Oleg
 Aleksandr Domogarov Jr. as a maniac

Release
The premiere screening of the film took place on August 13, 2018 as part of the XXVI national festival "Window to Europe", where it took first place in the voting of film critics and won the main prize of the festival in the feature film competition.

Why Don't You Just Die! is scheduled to be theatrically released in the Russian Federation in 2019.

Reception
On review aggregation website Rotten Tomatoes, the film has an approval rating of 97% based on 76 reviews, and an average rating of 7.4/10. The website's critical consensus reads, "As wickedly smart as it is energetic, Why Don't You Just Die! should satisfy audiences in the mood for a gore-soaked good time." It also has a score of 69 out of 100 on Metacritic, based on 11 critics, indicating "generally favorable reviews". Ed Potton of The Times rated the film 4 stars out of 5. Nikki Baughan of Empire rated the film 4 stars out of 5. William Hughes of AV Club rated the film "B". Wendy Ide of The Observer rated the film 4 stars out of 5. Peter Bradshaw of The Guardian rated the film 4 stars out of 5.

The film received positive reviews in the Los Angeles Times, The New York Times, NPR, Variety, and The Hollywood Reporter.

Simon Abrams of RogerEbert.com gave the film a more mixed review, rating it 2.5 stars out of 4.

References

External links
 
 

2010s Russian-language films
2010s comedy thriller films
2018 black comedy films
2018 thriller drama films
Russian comedy thriller films
Russian black comedy films
Russian thriller drama films